This list contains all spacewalks performed since the beginning of 2015 where an astronaut has fully, or partially left the spacecraft.

As of 19 August 2016, 215 astronauts have made spacewalks (out of 549 people who have gone into Earth orbit).

2015–2019 spacewalks

Spacewalk beginning and ending times are given in Coordinated Universal Time (UTC).

2015 spacewalks

2016 spacewalks

2017 spacewalks
Source:

2018 spacewalks
Source:

2019 spacewalks

2020–2024 spacewalks
Spacewalk beginning and ending times are given in Coordinated Universal Time (UTC).

2020 spacewalks

2021 spacewalks

2022 spacewalks

2023 spacewalks

See also
List of spacewalkers
List of cumulative spacewalk records

References

External links
 NASA list of EVA statistics (may not be updated)
 U. S. Human Spaceflight History
 NASA JSC Oral History Project
 "Boomers collect artifacts, memories of NASA's heyday": Historical moonwalk information.

Spacewalks and moonwalks
Spacewalks since 2015
 2015